Walter B. Preston   (April 6, 1868 – December 23, 1937) was a professional baseball player. He played outfield and third base in the National League for the Louisville Colonels during the 1895 season. He played in the minors through 1907.

External links

1868 births
1937 deaths
Major League Baseball outfielders
Major League Baseball third basemen
Louisville Colonels players
Baseball players from Richmond, Virginia
19th-century baseball players
Houston Mudcats players
San Antonio Missionaries players
St. Joseph Saints players
Memphis Lambs players
Memphis Giants players
Des Moines Prohibitionists players
Des Moines Indians players
Minneapolis Millers (baseball) players
St. Paul Saints (Western League) players
Omaha Omahogs players
St. Paul Apostles players
Denver Grizzlies (baseball) players
Omaha Indians players
Peoria Distillers players
Galveston Sand Crabs players